The California Ridge Wind Farm is a 134-turbine wind farm in eastern Champaign County and western Vermilion County in the U.S. state of Illinois.  The project was developed by Invenergy, an energy holding company.

Detail
The California Ridge complex's 134 wind turbines, each rated at 1.6 mW, were completed in December 2012.  The turbines can generate up to 217.0 megawatts of electricity.   The complex utilizes leasehold rights to 27,700 acres of Illinois land, and employs approximately 14 full-time workers in its ongoing operations.  Power generated by the project was pre-sold to the Tennessee Valley Authority.

References

Buildings and structures in Champaign County, Illinois
Buildings and structures in Vermilion County, Illinois
Energy infrastructure completed in 2012
Wind farms in Illinois